Yevgeni Sergeyevich Belashov (born 28 January 1980) is a former Russian professional football player.

Club career
He made his Russian Football National League debut for FC Baltika Kaliningrad on 8 May 2001 in a game against FC Lokomotiv Chita. That was his only season in the FNL.

See also
Football in Russia
List of football clubs in Russia

References

External links
 

1980 births
Living people
Russian footballers
Association football midfielders
Association football defenders
FC Baltika Kaliningrad players
FC Angusht Nazran players
FC Dynamo Stavropol players
FC Orenburg players
FC Volga Ulyanovsk players